Romania is scheduled to compete at the 2017 World Aquatics Championships in Budapest, Hungary from 14 July to 30 July.

Diving

Romania has entered two divers (one male and one female).

Swimming 

Romanian swimmers have achieved qualifying standards in the following events (up to a maximum of two swimmers in each event at the A-standard entry time, and one at the B-standard):

References 

Nations at the 2017 World Aquatics Championships
Romania at the World Aquatics Championships
2017 in Romanian sport